Anja Ignatius (July 2, 1911 – April 10, 1995) was a Finnish violinist and music educator, mainly known as a chamber musician.

She was born in Tampere, began studying violin at the age of five and gave her first concert at the age of fifteen. Ignatius studied in Finland, at the Paris Conservatory and in Prague. She performed with the Helsinki Philharmonic Orchestra in 1928. Between 1929 and 1931, she studied with Carl Flesch in Berlin. Besides concerts in Finland, Ignatius performed in Sweden, Norway, Denmark, Germany, Great Britain, France, Poland, the Soviet Union and the United States. She is best known for her interpretation of Sibelius' Violin Concerto.

In 1955, Ignatius became a professor teaching violin at the Sibelius Academy. She served on the juries for several national and international competitions.

References

External links 
 

1911 births
1995 deaths
Finnish classical violinists
Finnish music educators
20th-century classical violinists
Women classical violinists